The Guernsey cricket team is the team that represents the Bailiwick of Guernsey, a Crown dependency in international cricket. They became a member in 2005 and an associate member of the International Cricket Council (ICC) in 2008.

History

2018–present
In April 2018, the ICC decided to grant full Twenty20 International (T20I) status to all its members. Therefore, all Twenty20 matches played between Guernsey and other ICC members after 1 January 2019 will be a full T20I. 
Guernsey played their first T20I against Jersey on 31 May 2019.

International competition
Guernsey has a long rivalry with the neighbouring Channel Island of Jersey, playing an annual encounter against each other known as the inter-insular match since 1950. Guernsey had a run of ten consecutive defeats from 1992 to 2001.

They made their debut at the European Championship in 2006, and finished in 5th place in Division Two, the tournament being won by Norway. Since then they have won promotion to the T20 Championship Division One.

International matches are being played by Guernsey outside the above two events also, with matches against Bermuda and Namibia in 2005, and more matches against Bermuda in 2006. Games against France and a tour of Canada were planned for 2007.

Guernsey placed second at the 2009 Global Division Seven tournament, advancing to Division Six. In Division Six Guernsey finished 4th and therefore remained in Division Six. They came first in the 2011 Division Six tournament, advancing to 2012 ICC World Cricket League Division Five. However, they came third in the Division Five tournament, remaining in the division, before coming 5th and being relegated to Division Six for the 2015 season, winning immediate promotion puts them back in Division Five, where in 2016 they came 3rd, remaining in Division Five.

Guernsey is ranked 31st in the World and 7th in Europe in the World Cricket League (21 May 2016).

In September 2018, Guernsey qualified from Group C of the 2018–19 ICC T20 World Cup Europe Qualifier to the Regional Finals of the tournament.

Grounds

 College Field Cricket Ground, Saint Peter Port
 King George V Sports Ground, Castel

Tournament history

World Cricket League

 2009 Division Seven: 2nd place (promoted)
 2009 Division Six: 4th place 
 2011 Division Six: 1st place (promoted)
 2012 Division Five: 3rd place
 2014 Division Five: 5th place (relegated)
 2015 Division Six:  2nd place (promoted)
 2016 Division Five: 3rd place 
 2017 Division Five 6th place (relegated to regional tournaments)

European Championship Division 2

 2006 Division Two : 5th place
 2010 Division Two : 1st place (promoted to European T20 Championship Division 1)

European T20 Championship Division 1

 2011 Division One : 4th place
 2013 Division One : 3rd place
 2015 Division One : 4th place
 2018 Division Two : 2nd place
 2019 Division One : 5th place

Records and Statistics

International Match Summary — Guernsey
 
Last updated 31 July 2022

Twenty20 International 
 Highest team total: 153/6 v France, 31 July 2022 at Kerava National Cricket Ground, Kerava
 Highest individual score: 65*, Josh Butler v Jersey, 15 June 2019 at King George V Sports Ground, Castel  
 Best individual bowling figures: 4/17, Luke Bichard v France, 31 July 2022 at Kerava National Cricket Ground, Kerava

Most T20I runs for Guernsey

Most T20I wickets for Guernsey 

T20I record versus other nations

Records complete to T20I #1712. Last updated 31 July 2022.

World Cricket League statistics

Team statistics

Player statistics

Performance by Guernsey's cricketers in World Cricket League matches

ICC European Championship statistics

Sussex Cricket League
Guernsey joined Division 2 of the Sussex Cricket League in 2016 after Sussex clubs voted unanimously to allow the island to join the competition, playing as the Guernsey Sarnians.  Guernsey Sarnians cannot be promoted or relegated as they will play less games. Each league team plays ONE match against the Guernsey Sarnians XI. The points from these matches are included in team totals, and the Guernsey Sarnians XI's points are factored (by adjustment of bonus points) to show their relative League position.

Honours

Top five honours at international matches 

Highest scores
 Matthew Stokes - 135* vs Botswana at Ashlyns Road, Frinton-on-Sea, Essex on 8 September 2015
 Oliver Newey - 129* vs Fiji at Castle Park Cricket Ground, Colchester, Essex on 7 September 2015
 Jeremy Frith – 106 vs Suriname at King George V Sports Ground, Castel on 23 May 2009
 Jeremy Frith – 101* vs Nigeria at College Field, St Peter Port on 21 May 2009
 Jeremy Frith – 101 vs Malaysia at The Padang, Singapore on 5 September 2009

Best Bowling figures
 Jeremy Frith – 5/8 vs Suriname at King George V SG, Castel on 23 May 2009
 Jamie Nussbaumer – 5/19 vs Bahrain at The Padang, Singapore on 18 February 2012
 Jamie Nussbaumer – 5/35 vs Kuwait at Bayuemas Oval, Kuala Lumpur on 20 September 2011
 David Hooper – 5/47 vs Cayman Islands at The Padang, Singapore on 25 February 2012
 Max Ellis – 4/12 vs Cayman Islands at Royal Selangor Club, Kuala Lumpur on 6 March 2014

Updated to December 2015

Famous players

Two Guernsey players have played first class cricket elsewhere. Lee Savident, who was born on the island, played for Hampshire from 1997 to 2000, and Amitava Banerjee, who played for Bengal from 1996 to 2000, prior to moving to Guernsey. Batsman Tim Ravenscroft has played for Guernsey and played Hampshire, making one List A appearance in 2011.

See also

Guernsey Cricket Board
 List of Guernsey Twenty20 International cricketers

References

External links
 Guernsey Cricket Board
 ICC Cricket

Cricket in Guernsey
National cricket teams
 
Sports teams in Guernsey
C